Janee' Kassanavoid (born January 19, 1995) is an American track and field athlete who specializes in the hammer throw.

Professional career
On July 17, 2022, at the 2022 World Athletics Championships in Eugene, Oregon, Kassanavoid won the bronze medal with a distance of 74.86 m. As she is Native American (specifically, of the Comanche tribe), this made her the first Native American woman to win a medal at the World Athletics Championships.

US Track and field Championships

Kansas State University and Johnson County Community College
Janee' Kassanavoid is a 7-time Track and field All-American and 3-time Big 12 Conference champion.

High school
Kassanavoid is a 2013 alumnus of Lawson High School in Lawson, Missouri.

References

External links
 
 
 JANEE' KASSANAVOID 2017-18 Track & Field Profile Kansas State Wildcats
 Janee' Kassanavoid (Comanche): Pursuing World Class Plans a Week after Placing Fourth in the US Olympic Trials in the Hammer Throw Dan Ninham ndnsports.com
 
 Kansas State University Student Athlete Janee' Kassanavoid - Big 12 Champions for Life Kansas State University

1995 births
Living people
American female hammer throwers
Comanche people
Track and field athletes from Missouri
21st-century Native American women
21st-century Native Americans
21st-century American women
Native American sportspeople